The Davidstow Creamery is a manufacturing plant in Cornwall; it makes Cathedral City mature Cheddar cheese. It is the largest cheese factory in the UK, and the largest mature cheddar plant in the world.

History
The site is on a windswept hill top, and began in 1950.

The site was bought by the Milk Marketing Board in 1979; in 1980 the processing division was divested as the new company Dairy Crest.

In 2002 the site employed 174.

In 2019, Dairy Crest was bought by the Canadian company Saputo Inc.

Environmental concerns
On 22 June 2022, Dairy Crest was found guilty of environmental offences over a five-year period and fined £1.5 million. This is the largest fine ever awarded for an Environment Agency conviction in the South West of England. The pollution affected the River Inny, Cornwall and included releasing a harmful biocide into the river on 16 August 2016, killing thousands of fish over a 2-kilometre stretch, and coating the River Inny with a noxious, black sludge for 5 kilometres in 2018, through a release of a mass of suspended solids in July and August 2018.

Construction
The boiler house was added in 1968. The site was expanded in 1984 and 2001.

A £55m redevelopment opened in 2005.

Visits
Prince Charles visited the site on Tuesday 12 July 2011 to open a new £4.2m biomass plant. It is a waste wood biomass plant for high pressure steam. Two Byworth boilers produce 7000 kg/hr of steam at 23 bar, with Endress+Hauser energy monitoring. The boiler plant was built by Leadbitter from May 2010 to April 2011.

Structure
It is situated at the junction of the A39 and A395 in northern Cornwall.

Production
It makes 45,000 tonnes of cheese a year.

The cheese is taken from Davidstow to the national distribution centre at Nuneaton in north-east Warwickshire, where it is stored for 12 months to mature.

Dairy Crest also had made Cathedral City at its Maelor Creamery cheese packing plant, which opened in 1976 at Marchwiel in north Wales, which was sold (with other sites that made supermarket cheese) to First Milk in 2006, then closed in 2014. The Maelor site was the largest cheese packer in Europe producing 80,000 tonnes per year. Cathedral City cheese packing moved to Nuneaton in 2009. Dairy Crest also had a former cheese plant at Johnstown, Carmarthenshire.

Around 400 farmers supply milk to the site. Cheese made includes Cathedral City Cheddar and Davidstow Cheddar.

See also
 Taw Valley Creamery of Milk Link

References

Buildings and structures in Cornwall
Cheesemakers
Companies based in Cornwall
Cornish cuisine
Dairy products companies of the United Kingdom
Food manufacturers of England
Manufacturing plants in England